George Hall Jones (1837 - 2 September 1899) was a politician in colonial Queensland. He was a member of the Queensland Legislative Assembly from 1888 to 1891, representing the electorate of Burnett.

References

Members of the Queensland Legislative Assembly
1837 births
1899 deaths
19th-century Australian politicians